= Babu Gopinath Singh =

Indian politician

Member of Parliament, Rajya Sabha
- In office 1952–1960
- Constituency: Uttar Pradesh

Personal details
- Born: 15 April 1901
- Died: 24 July 1967 (aged 66)
- Party: Indian National Congress
- Spouse: Krishna Devi

Babu Gopinath Singh was an Indian politician. He was a Member of Parliament, representing Uttar Pradesh in the Rajya Sabha the upper house of India's Parliament as a member of the Indian National Congress
